Robinsoniella is an anaerobic, Gram-positive, spore-forming and non-motile bacterial genus from the family of Lachnospiraceae with one known species, Robinsoniella peoriensis.

References

Lachnospiraceae
Monotypic bacteria genera